The Hinsberg oxindole synthesis is a method of preparing oxindoles from the bisulfite additions of glyoxal. It is named after its inventor Oscar Hinsberg.

See also
 Friedel-Crafts alkylation
 Stolle synthesis
 Hinsberg reaction

References

Name reactions